Marie Tabarly (born 1 January 1984) is a French professional yacht sailor based in Lorient, France in Brittany.  She is the daughter of Éric Tabarly, who died while sailing in the Irish Sea in 1998. Marie originally had a career as an equine behaviourist but put it on hold after her horse got injured and decided to focus on sailing instead. She has a long history sailing many different yachts from a young age, such as Geronimo, the French trimaran which has broken many records, such as with Olivier de Kersauson, for which she was named the godmother at its christening. 

She primarily sails Pen Duick VI, a 73ft ketch built for Eric Tabarly’s 1973–1974 Whitbread Round the World Race.  In 2018, she embarked on a four-year round the world trip on Pen Duick VI, through her project, the Elemen'Terre Project.  This project was a sailing journey around the world that became a documentary series focused on reconnecting humans with nature through sailing, arts and outdoor sports.  Throughout the journey, many ambassadors joined such as Yann Tiersen, the writer Sylvain Tesson, the sailor Franck Cammas and the freediver Aurore Asso.  She will race Pen Duick VI in the Ocean Globe Race (OGR) in 2023. 

Prior to the OGR, she will race alongside Louis Duc in the Transat Jacques Vabre.

Accomplishments 
5 X winner of the 15M JI Championship 2011, 2013, 2014, 2016 and 2017.

References 

1984 births
Living people
French female sailors (sport)